Olearia lepidophylla, commonly known as club-moss daisy-bush, is a species of flowering plant in the family Asteraceae and is endemic to southern Australia. It is a rigid, erect to spreading shrub with tiny oblong to egg-shaped leaves and white and yellow, daisy-like inflorescences.

Description
The edges of the leaves are rolled under and the lower surface is covered with pale gey, woolly hairs. Flowering occurs from March to June and the fruit is a silky-hairy achene, the pappus with 29 to 44 bristles.

Taxonomy
This olearia was first formally described in 1807 by Christiaan Hendrik Persoon who gave it the name Aster lepidophyllus in his Synopsis Plantarum. In 1867, George Bentham changed the name to Olearia lepidophylla in Flora Australiensis. The specific epithet (lepidophylla) means "scale-leaved".

Distribution and habitat
Olearia lepidophylla grows in mallee and heath and on coastal sand dunes in the Esperance Plains, Hampton and Mallee bioregions of Western Australia, the south-east of South Australia, mainly in the far north-west of Victoria, the south-west of New South Wales and on the coast and a few inland areas of Tasmania.

References

lepidophylla
Eudicots of Western Australia
Flora of South Australia
Flora of New South Wales
Flora of Victoria (Australia)
Flora of Tasmania
Plants described in 1807
Taxa named by Christiaan Hendrik Persoon